Abdul Wahab Adam (8 December 1938 – 22 June 2014) was an Islamic scholar, Ameer (head) and Missionary-in-Charge of the Ahmadiyya Muslim Community of Ghana. He was a member of Ghana's National Peace Council and the National Reconciliation Commission that was set up in 2002.

Personal life
Adam was born in December 1938 at Brofeyedur - Adansi in the Ashanti Region of Ghana. He completed his secondary education at T.I. Ahmadiyya Secondary School, Kumasi, and then proceeded to the Ahmadiyya Muslim Seminary and Ahmadiyya Theological University, in Pakistan, where he received Diploma in Arabic and Honours Degree in Theology and Islamic Jurisprudence in 1960. After serving as the Brong-Ahafo Regional Missionary of Ahmadiyya Muslim Mission from 1960 - 1969, he became the Principal of the Ahmadiyya Muslim Missionary Training College at Saltpond, Ghana. In 1971, he was appointed to the high office of the Deputy Head of the Ahmadiyya Muslim Mission of the United Kingdom. He was subsequently promoted to the position of Ameer (Head) and Missionary-in-Charge of the Ahmadiyya Muslim Mission in Ghana. He has steered the affairs of the Mission with distinction since 1975.

He died on 22 June 2014. Three days later, State funeral was held, attended by the Vice President, Ministers of State, members of parliament and various leaders of the Christian and Muslim faiths.

Work
Adam served as a member of various governmental and non-governmental organizations which aim to promote values of democracy, peace and human rights. He was a member of Centre for Democracy and Development (CDD), the National Peace Council of Ghana, and the National Reconciliation Commission. He also served as the vice-chairman of Ghana Integrity lnitiatve and the co-founder and National President of Council of Religions of Ghana.

In his capacity as a member of the Ahmadiyya Muslim Mission, Adam worked as the Co-Editor of Muslim Herald, London and the Editor of Ahmadiyya Bulletin, London. He further served as a member World Council of Ahmadi Muslim Jurists. In his relationship with various Muslim bodies of Ghana, he is credited with the establishment of the Hilal Committee and the granting of national holidays to mark Eid al-Fitr and Eid-al-Adha festivals on the Islamic calendar.

References

Ghanaian Ahmadis
2014 deaths
Ghanaian religious leaders
Ghanaian theologians
1938 births
People from Ashanti Region
T.I. Ahmadiyya Senior High School (Kumasi) alumni